The Men's Malaysian Open Squash Championships 2013 is the men's edition of the 2013 Malaysian Open Squash Championships, which is a tournament of the PSA World Tour event International (prize money: $50,000). The event took place in Kuala Lumpur in Malaysia from the 12 September to the 15 September. Peter Barker won his first Malaysian Open trophy, beating Tarek Momen in the final.

Prize money and ranking points
For 2013, the prize purse was $ 50,000. The prize money and points breakdown is as follows:

Seeds

Draw and results

See also
PSA World Tour 2013
Malaysian Open Squash Championships
Women's Malaysian Open Squash Championships 2013

References

External links
PSA Malaysian Open Squash Championships 2013 website
Malaysian Open Squash Championships 2013 Squashsite website

Squash tournaments in Malaysia
Malaysian Open Squash Championships
2013 in Malaysian sport